Cooma is a town in the south of New South Wales, Australia. It is also on the Snowy Mountains Highway, connecting Bega with the Riverina.

Cooma is the main town of the Monaro region. The name could have derived from an Aboriginal word Coombah, meaning 'big lake' or 'open country'.

Cooma sources its water from the river.

History
The area now known as Cooma lies on the traditional lands of the Ngarigo people.

Cooma was explored by Captain J. M. Currie in 1823. It was first surveyed in 1840, and was gazetted in 1849. Cooma was proclaimed a municipality in 1879.

The railway from Sydney was extended from Royalla to Cooma in 1889 under the supervision of John Whitton. The line was closed to rail passenger traffic in 1989. The estimated population of Cooma was 47 in 1851 and it grew to 2330 (1911), 1969 (1933), 2249 (1947), 9103 (1966), 7353 (1976) and 7978 (1981).

In 1949, the town became the headquarters of the Snowy Mountains Scheme and grew rapidly. Those working on the Snowy Scheme depended on the railway and during construction of the scheme, the railways were one of the largest employers in the region. In 1959 the tenth anniversary of the scheme was celebrated with the erection of an avenue of flags representing the 27 nationalities of people working on the scheme.

Cooma has developed a growing tourism industry as it became the main rest stop for many travellers heading to the NSW snow fields during the winter months. As a result, the town nicknamed itself the 'Gateway to the Snowy Mountains'.

The Aviation Pioneers' Memorial at Cooma contains artifacts recovered from the Avro 618 Ten aircraft Southern Cloud, which crashed on 21 March 1931 in the Toolong range of the Australian Alps. The wreck was not found until 26 October 1958.

Heritage listings 
Cooma has a number of heritage-listed sites, including:
 Bradley Street: Cooma railway station
 59–61 Lambie Street: Royal Hotel
 Sharp Street: Rock Bolting Development Site

Population
According to the 2016 census of Population, there were 6,742 people in Cooma.
 Aboriginal and Torres Strait Islander people made up 3.2% of the population. 
 76.5% of people were born in Australia. The next most common country of birth was England at 2.6%.   
 82.5% of people spoke only English at home. 
 The most common responses for religion were Catholic 26.2%, No Religion 26.1% and Anglican 18.7%.

Education
The other two government schools support primary education and are Cooma Public School and Cooma North Public School, both providing education for students in kindergarten to year 6.

The Roman Catholic school is called St Patrick's Parish School and provides education from kindergarten to year 10. The Snowy Mountains Christian School, an independent Christian school provides education from kindergarten to year 10.

Tertiary education is provided by TAFE NSW Illawarra Institute Cooma campus.
Another Tertiary Education centre is the newly opened Cooma Universities Centre, which opened in 2014.

Climate
Cooma has a dry oceanic climate (Cfb) characteristic of the South Eastern Highlands. Summer averages are warm, though tend to swing wildly between hot and cool; and winters are chilly with particularly cold nighttime temperatures due to its valley location and frequent clear skies, sometimes recording the lowest temperatures in the country. However, daytime maximum temperatures in winter are often unremarkable, on account of the foehn effect. 

The area is exceptionally dry by southeast coastal Australian standards because it falls in a rain shadow; the region is flanked by mountain ranges on all sides, most notably from the west. Despite its dryness, it only has 90.1 clear days annually, lower than the adjacent coastal areas of Wollongong and Sydney (106 and 107 clear days, respectively). Strong cold fronts often push through the region in winter and snow is not uncommon in Cooma from June to August, however is generally light and rarely settles for more than 24 hours. Frost occurs in all months of the year, frequently so between April and October. Severe thunderstorms are semi-frequent in summer and due to the towns elevation can carry large quantities of hail.

The airport is located at a higher elevation than the town, causing maximum temperatures to be  notably cooler but minima somewhat milder.

Media

Newspapers
One newspaper operates in Cooma, The Monaro Post, which began in 2006, and is independently owned by Gail Eastaway, Tracy Frazer and Louise Platts.

Radio stations
XLFM 96.1 FM (commercial)
Snow FM 97.7 FM (commercial)
Triple J 100.1 FM
ABC South-East 810 AM/1602 AM
Radio National 95.3 FM/100.9 FM
Classic FM 99.3
Monaro FM 90.5 (community)
Racing Radio 96.9 FM
Vision Radio 88.0 FM (narrowcast, relay)

Note: transmitters for XLFM and Snow FM, as well as some ABC services, are in place throughout the Snowy Mountains.

Television
Cooma receives five free-to-air television networks including all the digital free-to-air channels relayed from Canberra, broadcast from the Telstra site Radio Hill translator in Cooma Common, off Polo Flat Road.

The stations are:
ABC
SBS
Prime7
WIN
Southern Cross 10
Another transmitter for the Cooma and surrounding Monaro region is located at Mount Roberts approximately 30 km NNE of the town, broadcasting The Three Commercial Networks and the ABC services, but not SBS Television Services.

Transport
Cooma is serviced by Cooma - Snowy Mountains Airport which is 15 kilometres from the CBD. Cooma has a bus service connecting various areas of town three times a day run by Cooma Coaches. Snowliner Coaches also operate services. Cooma has a taxi service run by Cooma Radio Taxis.

NSW TrainLink operate road coach services from Canberra to Bombala and Eden. Cooma was served by the Cooma Mail until May 1986 and the Canberra Monaro Express until September 1988.

The Cooma Monaro Railway is a heritage railway using CPH railmotors built in the 1920s. Until operations were suspended in January 2014, the railway operated a weekend and public holiday service on an 18-kilometre section of the Bombala railway line north to Bunyan and Chakola.

Notable people
 Samantha Armytage – breakfast show host
 John Bērziņš – bishop of Caracas of the Russian Orthodox Church Outside Russia; first Australian-born orthodox bishop
 Torah Bright – Olympic snowboarder
 Jamie Burns – NSW cricketer, 1927
 Nick Cotric – rugby league player in the National Rugby League and New South Wales rugby league team representative. 
 Carmen Duncan – actress
 Paula Duncan – actress
 Michael Gordon – rugby league player in the National Rugby League
 A. D. Hope – poet and essayist
 Pat Hughes DFC – Royal Australian Air Force pilot
 Keegan Joyce – actor and singer has a song called "Cooma" included in his album, Snow On Higher Ground 
 Horst Kwech – Austrian born, Cooma raised, motor racing driver in the early US based Trans-Am Series
 Virginia Lette – media personality
 Steve Liebmann – journalist
 John Tierney – Senator in the Government of Australia
 John Tranter – poet
 Wilton Welch – actor and playwright
 Brett White – rugby league player in the National Rugby League
 Jack Williams – rugby league player in the National Rugby League
 Sam Williams – rugby league player in the National Rugby League
 Charlotte Wood – writer

See also
 Cooma Correctional Centre
 Snowy Mountains Scheme
 Bombala railway line – Railway line through Cooma

Mosaic Time Walk
The Cooma–Monaro Time Walk in Centennial Park was a community project to mark the Bicentennial Year of 1988, from designs by Cooma College of TAFE and the Cooma–Monaro Historical Society.

References

External links

Snowy Mountains Highway
Snowy Mountains Scheme
Towns in New South Wales
Snowy Monaro Regional Council